Rosko is a New York singer and music producer.

Rosko may also refer to:
William (Rosko) Mercer, American disk jockey
Rosko, Poland
Emperor Rosko, US-born radio DJ best known for his time on Radio Caroline and BBC Radio 1
The name may be a short form for Rostislav (given name)

See also 
Roscoe (disambiguation)